Wapta Lake is a glacial lake in Yoho National Park in the Canadian Rockies of eastern British Columbia, Canada.

Wapta Lake is formed from Cataract Brook and Blue Creek in Yoho National Park, and is the source of the Kicking Horse River.

The Trans-Canada Highway passes on the north shore of the lake, while the Canadian Pacific Railway tracks follow the south shore.

See also
List of lakes in Yoho National Park

References

Canadian Rockies
Lakes of British Columbia
Yoho National Park
Kootenay Land District